Windsor—Tecumseh is a provincial electoral district in Ontario, Canada, that has been represented in the Legislative Assembly of Ontario since the 2007 provincial election and as Windsor—St. Clair for the 1999 provincial election and 2003 provincial elections.

It was created in 1996 from parts of Windsor—Riverside and Windsor—Walkerville.

It consists of the Town of Tecumseh, and the part of the City of Windsor lying east and north of a line drawn from the U.S. border southeast along Langlois Avenue, east along Tecumseh Road East, and southeast along Pillette Road to the southern city limit.

Members of Provincial Parliament

Election results

Windsor—Tecumseh

 

 

 

		

	

|align="left" colspan=2|Liberal hold
|align="right"|Swing
|align="right"| +0.23
|

Source:

^ Change is based on redistributed results.

Windsor—St. Clair

2007 electoral reform referendum

Sources
Elections Ontario Past Election Results
Map of riding for 2018 election

Ontario provincial electoral districts
Politics of Windsor, Ontario